The Cocarde ("Cockade") was a 40-gun Cocarde class frigate of the French Navy.

Ordered as Cocarde nationale, she was launched on 29 April 1794 in Saint Malo and commissioned in July under Lieutenant Allanic. Under Captain Quérangal, she took part in the Battle of Groix. She later took part in the Expédition d'Irlande. She was renamed Cocarde in June 1796.

In 1802, she served in the Caribbean. A series of beachings damaged her sails and hull to the point where she was condemned and broken up in 1803.

Sources and references

Cocarde-class frigates
Age of Sail frigates of France
1794 ships